The Public Libraries Act 1855 amended the Public Libraries Act 1850.

The provisions were:
to extend the right to adopt public library legislation beyond municipal boroughs to parish vestries 
to reduce the population requirement from 10,000 to 5,000
to allow parishes to group together to meet the population requirement
to explicitly include The Metropolis
to allow adoption if a two thirds majority were in favour at a public meeting

References

United Kingdom Acts of Parliament 1855
Public libraries in the United Kingdom
Library law
Social history of the United Kingdom